Colonel James Duff (1831 – 22 December 1878) was a British Army officer and Conservative Party politician from Westwick in Norfolk.

Duff was born in Elgin, the son of James Duff and his wife Charlotte, eldest daughter of Sir George Beeston Prescott. His grandfather was Major-General Sir James Duff.

Duff was educated at Rugby and entered the army as an ensign in 1851. He served with the 23rd Royal Welsh Fusiliers in the Crimean War, including the Siege of Sebastopol, and was taken prisoner in the Battle of Inkerman. He retired from the army in 1858 as a major, having received the Crimea Medal with two clasps, and became a Justice of the Peace (JP) in Norfolk.

He was elected as a Member of Parliament (MP) for North Norfolk at a by-election in April 1876, after the death of Frederick Walpole MP, and held the seat until his death less than three years later. In Parliament, Duff spoke on military matters, and was active in getting the Norfolk and Suffolk Fisheries Act 1877 through Parliament.

Personal life 
In 1859 Duff married Mary Laura Dawkins, daughter of Edward Dawkins. He died in office in December 1878, aged 47, at his London residence in Upper Brook Street.

References

External links 
 
 

1831 births
1878 deaths
Conservative Party (UK) MPs for English constituencies
UK MPs 1874–1880
Royal Welch Fusiliers officers
People educated at Rugby School
People from North Walsham
British Army personnel of the Crimean War